Shi, also spelled Si, or Shie, Shee, Sie, Sea, See, is an uncommon Korean surname, an element in two-syllable Korean given names. As given name meaning differs based on the hanja used to write it. There are 54 Hanja with the reading "shi" on the South Korean government's official list of hanja which may be registered for use in given names.

In Given names
Given names formed with the syllable "Shi(Si)" include:

First syllable
Masculine
Si-an
Si-ha
Si-heon
Si-ho
Si-hoo
Si-hoon
Si-hong
Si-hun
Si-hwan
Si-hyuk
Si-hyung
Si-joon
Si-kyung
Si-wan
Si-woo
Si-woong
Si-yang
Si-yong

Unisex
Si-eon
Si-hyun
Si-on
Si-won
Si-young
Si-yoon

Feminine
Si-ah
Si-eun
Si-yeon
Si-yoo
Si-yool

People
People with the first syllable Shi(Si) include:

Lee Si-young (born 1950), South Korean writer
Park Si-hun (born 1965), South Korean amateur boxer
Bang Si-hyuk (born 1972), South Korean lyricist, composer, producer, and record executive
Ryu Si-won (born 1972), South Korean actor and singer
Sung Shi-yeon (born 1975), South Korean classical conductor
Park Si-hoo (born Park Pyeong-ho, 1978), South Korean actor
Sung Si-kyung (born 1979), South Korean singer and television host
Park Si-yeon (born Park Mi-seon, 1979), South Korean actress
Son Si-hyun (born 1980), South Korean shortstop for the NC Dinos in the KBO League
Park Si-eun (born Park Eun-young, 1980), South Korean actress
Lee Si-eon (born Lee Bo-yeon, 1982), South Korean actor
Lee Si-young (born Lee Eun-rae, 1982), South Korean actress and former amateur boxer
Shiyoon Kim (born 1983), Korean-American character designer and concept artist for Walt Disney Animation Studios
Ahn Shi-hyun (born 1984), South Korean professional golfer
Yoon Shi-yoon (born Yoon Dong-gu, 1986), South Korean actor
Choi Si-won (born 1986), South Korean actor and singer, member of boy group Super Junior
Lee Si-won (born 1987), South Korean actress
Kwak Si-yang (born Kwak Myeong-jin, 1987), South Korean actor
Jang Si-hwan (born 1987), South Korean baseball player
Park Si-hwan (born 1987), South Korean singer
Im Si-wan (born 1988), South Korean singer and actor
Lee Si-a (born Lee Ji-a, 1990), South Korean actress and singer
Song Si-woo (born 1993), South Korean football midfielder
Kim Si-woo (born 1995), South Korean golfer
Lee Si-young (born 1997), South Korean footballer
Kim Si-hyeon (born 1999), South Korean singer, member of girl group Everglow
Park Si-eun (born 2001), South Korean actress

See also
List of Korean given names

References

Korean given names